Ferdinand Brucker (January 8, 1858 – March 3, 1904) was an American lawyer and politician from the U.S. state of Michigan. He served one term in the United States House of Representatives from 1897 to 1899.

Early life and education
Brucker was born in Bridgeport, Michigan, where he attended the common schools. He was a member of the State militia 1878-1881. He graduated from the law department of the University of Michigan at Ann Arbor in 1881, was admitted to the bar the same year, and commenced practice in Saginaw.

Political career
He was an alderman of East Saginaw, 1882–1884, a judge of the probate court of Saginaw County, 1888–1896, and a delegate to the 1896 Democratic National Convention.

Brucker was elected as a Democrat from Michigan's 8th congressional district to the 55th Congress, serving from March 4, 1897 to March 3, 1899. He was an unsuccessful candidate for reelection in 1898, losing to Joseph W. Fordney.

Death
After leaving Congress, Ferdinand Brucker resumed the practice of law. 

He died in Saginaw, and is interred in Oak Grove Cemetery in Bridgeport.  His son, Wilber M. Brucker, later served as Governor of Michigan from 1931 to 1932.

References

The Political Graveyard

1858 births
1904 deaths
Burials in Michigan
Michigan lawyers
Politicians from Saginaw, Michigan
Democratic Party members of the United States House of Representatives from Michigan
University of Michigan Law School alumni
People from Bridgeport, Michigan
19th-century American judges
19th-century American lawyers
19th-century American politicians